Gevotroline (WY-47,384) is an atypical antipsychotic with a tricyclic structure which was under development for the treatment of schizophrenia by Wyeth-Ayerst. It acts as a balanced, modest affinity D2 and 5-HT2 receptor antagonist and also possesses high affinity for the sigma receptor. It was well tolerated and showed efficacy in phase II clinical trials but was never marketed.

See also 
 Atypical antipsychotic
 Atiprosin
 Azepindole

References 

Abandoned drugs
Atypical antipsychotics
Fluoroarenes
3-Pyridyl compounds
Pyridoindoles
Gamma-Carbolines